Ictidosuchus is an extinct genus of therocephalian therapsids.

References

 The main groups of non-mammalian synapsids at Mikko's Phylogeny Archive

Ictidosuchids
Therocephalia genera
Fossil taxa described in 1910
Taxa named by Robert Broom